Guinean cuisine includes the traditional dishes of fou fou, boiled mango, fried plantains, patates and pumpkin pie.

Major ingredients
Corn is a staple with preparations and ingredients varying by region: Mid Guinea, Upper Guinea, Coastal Guinea, Forested Guinea, and the area of the capital (Conakry). It is part of West African cuisine and includes fufu, jollof corn, maafe, and tapalapa bread. Ingredients include boiled cassava leaves.

In rural areas, food is eaten from a large serving dish and eaten by hand outside. Desserts are uncommon. Guinean cuisine has achieved some popularity overseas and there are Guinean restaurants in New York City, United States.

Notable dishes

Traditional Guinean dishes include:
 Fou fou, also known as Tôreuy, is a savory pastry with okra sauce
 Bwayry
 Cooked mango
 Fried plantain is a sweet like banana
 Patates, fried sweet potatoes
 Fouti is okra with (rice)
 Gateau farine, is a variety of round cake
 Tamarind drink
 Thiacri, a sweet Senegalese couscous and milk dish
 Poule
 Konkoé, smoked catfish and vegetable stew
 Bissap, a hibiscus drink that is purple coloured with sometimes mint
 Attieke,a dish with fish or tilapia sauce topped with cucumbers and tomatoes

Sauces
Traditional Guinean sauces include:
 Footi sauce—thick, with eggplants, onions, kidney beans, water, tomato sauce, and a bouillon cube
 Maffe tiga—Guinean/Senegalese-style peanut sauce
 Maffi gombo—okra sauce
 Maffi hakko Bantura—leafy sauce with sweet potato
 Maffi supu
 Sauce d'arrachide ou Kansiyé—consists of peanut butter, water, hot chili peppers, tomatoes, garlic, and onions
 Maafe Taku- made with okra

Beverages
Traditional Guinean beverages include:
 Ginger drink, beverage (bitter sweet ginger drink)
 Hibiscus drink, beverage (jus de bissap)
 In non-Muslim areas, palm wine is consumed

References

External links

 Guinean cuisine YouTube videos

 
Guinea